Democrat Creek is a stream in Knox County in the U.S. state of Missouri. It is a tributary to Rock Creek. The confluence is approximately one mile south-southeast of Edina.

Democrat Creek was named for the fact a large share of the early settlers were Democrats.

See also
List of rivers of Missouri

References

Rivers of Knox County, Missouri
Rivers of Missouri